Mouloud Akloul (born March 18, 1983 in Lorient) is a French footballer who is currently unattached.

Career

Club
Akloul started his career 1990 in the youth system of his local club, Lorient-Sports. In 1996, at the age of 13, he moved across town to join city rival FC Lorient. He played with his new team until 2001, eventually graduating to the FC Lorient's reserve squad. After eight years at Lorient, he again moved to Vannes, and helped the club secure a promotion to the Championnat de France amateur for the 2004-05 season.

In January 2007, Akloul left France and signed with MO Béjaïa in the Algerian Championnat National 2, where he spent 6 months. In 2007 Akloul left Algeria to play in the United Arab Emirates for Al-Ittihad Kalba of the UAE Football League.

On April 8, 2010, Akloul signed for the Vancouver Whitecaps of the USSF Division 2 Professional League. He made his debut for the team on April 24, 2010 against AC St. Louis, but during the game he broke his ankle while scoring his team's winning goal. He did not return to action until October 2, in the Whitecaps' final regular season game of the year.

The expansion Vancouver Whitecaps FC signed Akloul to a Major League Soccer contract on March 31, 2011. The Whitecaps released Akloul on July 28, 2011.

International
Akloul played for the France national under-17 football team in 1999 and 2000. He is also eligible to play for Algeria.

Personal life
He holds the dual nationality, being both a citizen of France and Algeria.

References

External links
 Vancouver Whitecaps bio
 DZFoot Profile

1983 births
Living people
Algerian footballers
French expatriate sportspeople in Algeria
French footballers
Algerian expatriate footballers
Sportspeople from Lorient
Expatriate footballers in France
FC Lorient players
French sportspeople of Algerian descent
Expatriate footballers in the United Arab Emirates
French expatriate footballers
Expatriate footballers in Algeria
Vancouver Whitecaps (1986–2010) players
Vancouver Whitecaps FC players
Algerian expatriate sportspeople in France
Expatriate soccer players in Canada
Algerian expatriate sportspeople in the United Arab Emirates
USSF Division 2 Professional League players
MO Béjaïa players
Al-Ittihad Kalba SC players
Major League Soccer players
UAE First Division League players
Association football defenders
Footballers from Brittany